Neville Chamberlain (1869–1940) was Prime Minister of the United Kingdom.

Neville Chamberlain may also refer to:
 Sir Neville Bowles Chamberlain (1820–1902), British soldier
 Sir Neville Francis Fitzgerald Chamberlain (1856–1944), British soldier, inventor of snooker
 Neville Chamberlain (bishop) (1939–2018), bishop of the Anglican Diocese of Brechin, 1997–2005
 Neville Chamberlain (footballer) (born 1960), English football player